The 1972 Singapore Grand Prix was a motor race held at the Thomson Road Grand Prix circuit in Singapore on 2 April 1972. The race, which was staged over 50 laps, was the seventh Singapore Grand Prix.

The race was won by Australian Max Stewart driving a Mildren-Ford.

Race results

Note: The above list is most likely incomplete.

References

Grand Prix
Singapore Grand Prix
Singapore Grand Prix